Benjamin Richard Green (1807/8–1876) was an English watercolour painter and author. He exhibited at the Royal Academy and Suffolk Street exhibitions from 1832, and executed several works in lithography besides watercolours.

Life 
Benjamin Richard Green, born in London in 1807 or 1808, was son of James Green, the portrait painter. He studied art in the schools of the Royal Academy, and painted both figures and landscapes, mostly in watercolour. He was elected in 1834 a member of the Institute of Painters in Water-Colours. Green was very much employed as a teacher of drawing and a lecturer. He exhibited frequently at the Royal Academy and the Suffolk Street exhibitions, beginning in 1832, and also at the various exhibitions of paintings in watercolours. In 1829 Green published a numismatic atlas of ancient history, executed in lithography; a French edition of this work was published in the same year. Green also published some works on perspective, a lecture on ancient coins, and a series of heads from the antique. He was for many years secretary of the Artists' Annuity Fund, and died in London on 5 October 1876, aged 68. There is a watercolour drawing by him of the Interior of Stratford-on-Avon Church which entered the collection of the South Kensington Museum.

Gallery

References

Sources 

 

Attribution:

Further reading 

 Bryan, Michael (1886). "Green, Benjamin Robert". Bryan's Dictionary of Painters and Engravers. Vol. 1. New ed. Graves, Robert Edward (ed.). London: George Bell and Sons. p. 597.
 Graves, Algernon (1884). A Dictionary of Artists Who Have Exhibited Works in the Principal London Exhibitions of Oil Paintings From 1760 to 1880. London: George Bell and Sons. p. 99.
 Redgrave, Samuel (1878). "Green, Benjamin R." A Dictionary of Artists of the English School. New ed. London: George Bell and Sons. p. 185.
 "Green, Benjamin Richard". Benezit Dictionary of Artists. Oxford Art Online. 2011. Retrieved 22 September 2022.

1800s births
1876 deaths
19th-century English painters
English watercolourists